Berdashen or Karakend is a village de facto in the Martuni Province of the breakaway‎ Republic of Artsakh, de jure in the Khojavend District of Azerbaijan, in the disputed region of Nagorno-Karabakh.

The village has an ethnic Armenian-majority population, and also had an Armenian majority in 1989.

History 
During the Soviet period, the village was a part of the Martuni District of the Nagorno-Karabakh Autonomous Oblast.

During the First Nagorno-Karabakh War, on November 20, 1991, an Azerbaijani MI-8 military helicopter, carrying a peacekeeping mission team consisting of 13 Azerbaijani government officials, 2 Russian and 1 Kazakhstani Ministry of Internal Affairs officials, 3 Azerbaijani journalists and 3 helicopter crewmen was shot down by Armenian forces near the village. All 22 people (19 passengers and 3 crew) on board were killed in the crash.

Historical heritage sites 
Historical heritage sites in and around the village include a 12th-century khachkar, the 17th-century church of Surb Astvatsatsin, the chapel of Mets Nahatak built in 1676, a 17th/18th-century shrine and the fortress of Kusaberd, also known as Aghjkaberd.

Economy and culture 
As of 2015, the village has a municipal building, a house of culture, a secondary school, a kindergarten, six shops, and a medical centre.

Demographics 
The village had 1,498 inhabitants in 2005, and 1,606 inhabitants in 2015.

Gallery

References

External links 

 

Populated places in Martuni Province
Populated places in Khojavend District